Karim-Mohamed Maamoun (born 9 April 1991 in Cairo) is an Egyptian tennis player. Maamoun has a career high ATP singles ranking of 225 achieved on 2 October 2017. Maamoun has represented Egypt at the Davis Cup where he has a W/L record of 17–9.

Singles titles

Doubles titles

External links

1991 births
Living people
Egyptian male tennis players
Sportspeople from Cairo
African Games silver medalists for Egypt
African Games bronze medalists for Egypt
African Games medalists in tennis
Competitors at the 2019 African Games
21st-century Egyptian people